Elizabeth Klarer (née Woollatt; 1 July 1910 – 9 February 1994) was a South African woman who, starting in 1956, publicly claimed to have been contacted by aliens multiple times between 1954 and 1963. Klarer's first visitation supposedly occurred when she was seven and she was one of the first women to claim a sexual relationship with an extraterrestrial. She promoted an ideal of a better world and beliefs in a cosmic consciousness. In her book Beyond the Light Barrier, she strived to convey a message of peace, love, understanding and environmentalism, which she credited to the superior wisdom of an advanced and immaculately utopian Venusian civilization. She promoted conspiracy theories of an international cover-up that kept vital information from the public, and claimed to have been threatened with abduction to press her into revealing details about alien technology.

Biography
Elizabeth was born in 1910 at Mooi River, Natal, as the youngest daughter of SB and Florence Woollatt. SB was a pioneering veterinary surgeon who subsequently settled at Connington farm near Rosetta in the Natal midlands. Here he became a successful shorthorn farmer, and as a dedicated polo player, introduced young people to the sport.

Here, at age seven, Elizabeth and her older sister Barbara also had their first supposed UFO encounter. While feeding their Sealyham puppies outside the farmhouse Elizabeth and her sister claimed that they witnessed a silver disc bathed in a pearly luster which swooped over them. Simultaneously a giant, orange-red and cratered planetoid was observed orbiting and rotating high in the atmosphere. The disc rushed to meet it, pacing and guiding it northwards, while the planetoid left a smoke trail in its wake.

Only months later she had another sighting in the company of Ladam, their Zulu farm manager. Ladam interpreted the sighting in terms of Zulu mythology. Elizabeth sometimes alluded to an even earlier sighting, at age three in 1913/14.

Elizabeth graduated from St. Anne's Diocesan College in Pietermaritzburg, and moved to Florence, Italy, to study art and music. Thereafter she completed a four-year diploma in meteorology at Girton College, Cambridge, and was taught by her first husband to fly a Tiger Moth light aircraft. In 1932 the three Woollatt sisters and Maureen Taylor formed the Connington polo team and drew a match against the Durban ladies' team, which is seen as the first officially recorded ladies' match in South Africa. During a 1937 flight from Durban to Baragwanath in a Leopard Moth aircraft, she and her husband reportedly saw a saucer that approached, coasted along, and then departed from them. During World War II she held a responsible position in RAF Intelligence.

She believed in telepathic powers, and tried to enhance these abilities since her youth.

Flying Saucer Hill
In 1954, her sister May, then resident on the farm Whyteleafe in the Natal midlands, relayed to her that the native Zulu people were reporting appearances of the lightning bird in the sky. In response Elizabeth and her children travelled from Johannesburg to the farm, and she ascended Flying Saucer Hill the following day, December 27. There she claimed to have seen the star ship descend. It hovered three metres above ground, while only emitting a soft hum – its hull spinning, though its central dome remained stationary. The spaceman who later identified himself as Akon was supposedly clearly visible through one of three portholes, but a barrier of heat that emanated from the ship prevented her from approaching, and his scout ship departed again.

Some 18 months later, she visited the hilltop again, after further reports of the lightning bird. Inside, she met a second pilot, stocky and darker-skinned than Akon, who was supposedly a botanist as well as an astrophysicist. She was allegedly shown a lens that offered views through the craft's floor. With only a hum emanating from below and no sense of movement, they were transported to the enormous cigar-shaped mother ship which had a garden-like interior. After meeting its inhabitants, she was returned to the hilltop, a similar arrangement as that made between Adamski and Orthon in 1952. During the encounter kisses were exchanged and Akon revealed that Elizabeth was in fact a reincarnated Venusian, and long-lost soulmate. He further explained that they occasionally took Earth women as partners, as the offspring strengthened their race with an infusion of new blood. He also claimed that a number of Venusians were surreptitiously living among human beings.

From 17:45 on 30 April 1956, various observers noted a steady red glow poised at a rocky section of the hill, which remained there until 2:00 in the morning. No sign of a fire could be found afterwards.

On July 17, 1956, after their family farm was sold, she made a subsequent visit to the area, and claimed to have taken a series of 7 photos of Akon's scout ship using her sister's (or daughter's) simple Brownie box camera.  Vivid light flashes turned into a dull grey craft enveloped in a shimmering heat haze. For an hour the disc darted silently over a rise near the farmhouse, making several weaving detours, and it shone like silver in bright sunlight before streaking away out of sight. Edgar Sievers, a ufologist from Pretoria, stated that her family saw her leave the homestead alone, and suggested that the frail Elizabeth would have found it difficult to throw a car hubcap and photograph it at the same time. He also stated that no make of hubcap had been illustrated to sufficiently resemble the disc in the photos.

Space-motherhood
In April 1958 a series of contacts reportedly started that set her story apart from the UFO stories that were standard in the 1950s. The visits by Akon culminated in a day-long rendezvous with Elizabeth on the high plateau of Cathkin Peak, where he supposedly presented her with a silver ring which enhanced their telepathic connection. Their love was consummated and a child was conceived.

After a terrestrial pregnancy she and her MG car were transported in 1959 to Akon's home planet, Meton, supposedly orbiting Proxima Centauri in the nearby multiple-star system Alpha Centauri. There she delivered a son, who was given the name Ayling. He stayed behind on Meton to be educated, while Elizabeth reluctantly came home. Meton's planetary vibrations supposedly affected her heart, and she was consequently not permitted to return there, instead receiving follow-up visits from Akon and Ayling. The whole trip, delivery and return trip supposedly required less than four months, sufficiently long to enable a nine-year stay on Meton however.

Klarer took far more time before publishing a book, Beyond the Light Barrier (1980), about her extraterrestrial adventures. On his world lecture tour in the late 1950s, George Adamski made a point of visiting South Africa and looking up Klarer for a chat on their variety of experiences with the friendly, wise "space brothers." By that time, Klarer was not the only Adamski follower to experience claimed space-motherhood.

Later years
After her sister and brother-in-law died, Elizabeth returned from Natal to Johannesburg. There she worked for a time in a CNA book store, but found city life stifling. From the 1950s onwards her outlandish claims made her a darling of the press, who also loved to ridicule her. She welcomed any press however, as the dissemination of Akon's message was paramount – a life-task of extreme importance. The account of her observations and contact experience in Flying Saucer Review of Nov-Dec 1956 was noticed by Edith Nicolaisen. Nicolaisen's correspondence with Elizabeth consists of 23 letters, written from 1956 to 1976. She published the Klarer story in the small booklet I rymdskepp över Drakensberg in 1959, and a second edition appeared in 1967. From about 1960 to 1966 Elizabeth worked on the manuscript for her book, which now included the Akon love saga, as she couldn't "hide the truth in these matters." In 1968 Elizabeth agreed to be interviewed by ufologist Cynthia Hind, and Hind's write-up of her story appeared in Fate magazine of August that year. Ufologist Kitty Smith established contact with Elizabeth after reading about her in Outspan magazine, and claimed her own sighting of Akon's ship in January 1984.

When another South African, Ann Grevler, claimed alien contact in the late 1950s, Elizabeth was outspoken and issued various challenges to her to defend her statements in an open forum. Likewise she denounced Philipp Human's supposed contact through a trance medium, and this caused a rift between them. In her view the space people would never stoop to such methods. In 1975 she was invited by Hermann Oberth to attend the 11th International Congress of UFO Research Groups in Wiesbaden, Germany. She delivered an address there on 2 November, for which she received a standing ovation. In May 1992 Smith arranged a talk by Klarer at the Unidentified Flying Object Club in Pietermaritzburg. This was so popular that the crowd grew too large to cope with.

Elizabeth faithfully commemorated the April 7th anniversary of her union with Akon by returning to Flying Saucer Hill. On one occasion she befriended SAAF helicopter pilots who sought shelter on the farm during a storm, and they facilitated visits to the hill when a ride on horseback became too difficult for her. Her third husband Aubrey Fielding died in 1981 and his ashes were strewn on the hill. Elizabeth died of breast cancer at age 84, leaving her second book The Gravity File unfinished. The book filled in the gaps of the first, besides elucidating the military and political aspects of UFO research, and explaining Akon's "electro-gravity propulsion" technology. Before her death she related to acquaintances that Ayling (like Akon) was now an astrophysicist, who was crisscrossing the universe with his father, his space woman Clea, and their son.

Assessment
Ufologist Thomas Streicher concluded that Klarer's claims are generally poorly substantiated, despite some of them being corroborated by witnesses. Her sister and first husband for instance attested two UFO sightings, but witnesses are lacking to confirm her pregnancy, and it remains unknown whether it was ever documented. He speculates that she was perhaps a fantasy-prone individual who merely imagined most of her experiences. Elizabeth's son David, in particular, has no recollection of an event, absence or pregnancy of his mother that could tie in with her purported space adventures in 1959.

Ufologist Cynthia Hind noted Elizabeth's absolute conviction that she was telling the truth, and never suspected that she was deliberately lying. Hind suspected that an active imagination or illusions borne from a dream-state of euphoria were to be blamed for the improbabilities and inconsistencies inherent to her stories. Both Hind and Smith however alluded to sightings of Akon by members of the public, and Hind concluded: "all these factors need examination and it is time we stopped casting aside [such] cases which, although sounding like hoaxes, are not obviously so." Ufologist Edgar Sievers, who also interviewed her family, was completely satisfied that her experiences, at least up to and including the photographs, were of a physical rather than psychic nature.

Ufologist Philipp Human initially heaped effusively praise on Elizabeth, but later changed his stance: "I do not believe one word of her supposed […] contacts and it was a standing joke the way she was helped to photograph an ordinary motor car hubcap. So much for her photographs […] That was before she added additional material to tell of her pregnancy caused by her Venusian lover, […] I pray that this book will never be published." To this Edith Nicolaisen replied: "Don't be afraid, we shall never publish [the story of her Venusian lover, but] I would like to reprint [the] booklet about her contacts. I do believe that she has had some sort of contact."

The Mensa chapter of Johannesburg did not take kindly to her claims and she was heckled during her address. Hard evidence for her claim that she addressed the House of Lords in 1983, and that a paper of hers was read during that year at a UFO congress at the United Nations, has not been found. Supposed hard evidence presented by Elizabeth included her set of 1956 photographs, the ring she received from Akon, a space rock or crystal, and a fern from Meton. Her supportive husband Aubrey remained unperturbed by his wife's love for Akon, reportedly saying, "That's all right with me – as long as he stays in space where he belongs".

Bibliography
Jenseits der Lichtmauer: Vorgeschichte und Bericht einer Weltraumreise (1977)
Beyond the Light Barrier (1980)

In popular culture
Elizabeth Klarer is mentioned in the song Even Elizabeth Klarer on the album Shakey is Good (2008) by South African singer-songwriter Jim Neversink.

Season 8 episode 17 of Adventure Time ("High Strangeness") the character Tree Trunks and her alien experience are a reference to Elizabeth Klarer.

Elizabeth Klarer is the subject of focus on Episode 477: Elizabeth Klarer of the podcast show The Last Podcast on the Left.

References

External links 
 Elizabeth Klarer Pt. 1 Love knows no bounds, Extraterrestrial, Parcast Network (Cutler Media), Bill Thomas & Tim Johnson, 12 February 2019
 Elizabeth Klarer Pt. 2: Intergalactic Courtship, Extraterrestrial, Parcast Network (Cutler Media), Bill Thomas & Tim Johnson, 12 February 2019
 A 1999 summary of some of the same material

1910 births
1994 deaths
South African non-fiction writers
UFO writers
Ufologists
Contactees
South African writers
20th-century South African women writers
20th-century South African writers
20th-century non-fiction writers
South African folklore